The sixth competition weekend of the 2011–12 ISU Speed Skating World Cup was held in the Thialf arena in Heerenveen, Netherlands, from Friday, 2 March, until Sunday, 4 March 2012.

Schedule of events
The schedule of the event is below:

Medal summary

Men's events

Women's events

References

External links

6
Isu World Cup, 2011-12, 6
ISU Speed Skating World Cup, 2011-12, World Cup 6